The Adolescent Family Life Act (AFLA) is a United States federal law enacted during the Reagan Administration as part of the Omnibus Budget Reconciliation Act of 1981. AFLA provided funding for a series of social programs aimed at promoting abstinence through reproductive health education.

Background
The original bill, was proposed by Jeremiah Denton (R-AL) and Orrin Hatch (R-UT) as an amendment to the Public Health Service Act of 1970. On 4 November 1981, Senate voted to indefinitely postpone S. 1090. However, its provisions to amend the Public Health Service Act, repeal parts of the Health Services and Centers Amendments of 1978, and provide grants for the Adolescent Family Life Demonstration Projects were incorporated into the  Omnibus Budget Reconciliation Act of 1981.

Controversy
The bill carried strong religious undertones, particularly with the strategic funding of Catholic organizations. Consequently, questions were raised with regard to the constitutionality of the law. The case was later brought before the Supreme Court in 1988 in Bowen v. Kendrick, which upheld the law.

References

97th United States Congress
1981 in law
United States federal health legislation
United States federal reconciliation legislation